Willersey Halt railway station served the village of Willersey, Gloucestershire, England between 1904 and 1960.

History
The halt was opened by the Great Western Railway on 1 August 1904. Situated only a half-mile from the village of Willersey, the station was to the south-west of the road bridge, and there were two  wooden platforms, each with a corrugated iron "pagoda" shelter. The initial service consisted of 9 Down and 8 Up railmotor services a day.

It was closed by British Railways on 7 March 1960.

Present day
Little remains of the halt apart from some old railings at the end of the footpath on the village side. The trackbed through the site is unbreached and is in use as a footpath.

References

Notes

Sources

External links
Willersey Halt on navigable 1946 O.S. map

Disused railway stations in Gloucestershire
Former Great Western Railway stations
Railway stations in Great Britain opened in 1904
Railway stations in Great Britain closed in 1960